The Scalp Merchant is a 1978 Australian television film directed by Howard Rubie. It is about a private investigator.

Plot synopsis
A private investigator is brought in to help recover the dough that was stolen from an Australian timber company and thinks that the box the money was taken in has been hidden in a lake. When a search team heads in the direction of where the box may be located, dangerous things begin to happen.

Cast
John Waters
Elizabeth Alexander
Ron Haddrick
Ric Hutton
Cameron Mitchell
Joan Sydney
Margaret Nelson

References

External links

Australian television films
1978 television films
1978 films
1970s English-language films
Films directed by Howard Rubie
1970s Australian films